The Chagossians (also Îlois or Chagos Islanders) are a currently exiled African ethnic group native to the Chagos Islands, specifically Diego Garcia, Peros Banhos, and the Salomon island chain, as well as other parts of the Chagos Archipelago, from the late 18th century until the middle of 20th century. Most Chagossians now live in Mauritius and the United Kingdom after being forcibly removed by the British government in the late 1960s and early 1970s so that Diego Garcia, the island where most Chagossians lived, could serve as the location for a United States military base. Today, no Chagossians are allowed to live on the island of Diego Garcia, as it is now the site of the military base dubbed Camp Thunder Cove.

The Chagossian people's ancestry is mostly African, particularly from Madagascar, Mozambique and other African nations including Mauritius. There is also a significant proportion of Indian and Malay ancestry. The French brought some to the Chagos Islands as slaves from Mauritius in 1786. Others arrived as fishermen, farmers, and coconut plantation workers during the 19th century.

The Chagossians speak Chagossian Creole, a French-based creole language whose vocabulary also incorporates words originating in various African and Asian languages and is part of the Bourbonnais Creole family. Chagossian Creole is still spoken by some of their descendants in Mauritius and the Seychelles. Chagossian people living in the UK speak English. Some settled in the town of Crawley in West Sussex, and the Chagossian community there numbered approximately 3,000 in 2016. Manchester also has a Chagossian community, which has included artist Audrey Albert.

In 2016, the British government rejected the right of the Chagossians to return to the islands after a 45-year legal dispute. In 2019, the International Court of Justice issued an advisory opinion stating that the United Kingdom did not have sovereignty over the Chagos Islands and that the administration of the archipelago should be handed over "as rapidly as possible" to Mauritius.

In February 2022, five Chagossians visited the disputed archipelago with the assistance of Mauritius, fifty years after the United Kingdom forcibly exiled them.

History

Early history and ethnogenesis 
In 1793, when the first successful colony was founded on Diego Garcia, coconut plantations were established on many of the atolls and isolated islands of the archipelago. Initially the workers were enslaved Africans, but after 1840 they were freemen, many of whom were descended from those earlier enslaved. They formed an inter-island culture called Ilois (a French Creole word meaning Islanders).

Eviction 

In 1965, as part of a deal to grant Mauritian independence, the UK separated the Chagos Archipelago, at the time a part of its Mauritius territory, from the colony and reorganized it as the British Indian Ocean Territory. The territory's new constitution was set out in a statutory instrument imposed unilaterally with no referendum or consultation with the Chagossians and it envisaged no democratic institutions. On 16 April 1971, the United Kingdom issued a policy called BIOT Immigration Ordinance #1 which made it a criminal offense for those without military clearance to be on the islands without a permit.

A number of Chagossians who were evicted reported that they were threatened with being shot or bombed if they did not leave the island. One old man reported to The Washington Post journalist David Ottaway that an American official told him, "If you don't leave you won't be fed any longer." BIOT commissioner Bruce Greatbatch later ordered all dogs/pets on the island to be destroyed. Meanwhile, food stores on the island were allowed to deplete in order to pressure the remaining inhabitants to leave. The Chagossians owned no real property on the islands and lived in housing provided for farm workers by the absentee landowners of the plantations. The forced expulsion of the Chagossians after the acquisition of the plantations from their absentee landlords by the British Government was for the purpose of establishing a United States air and naval base on Diego Garcia, with a population of between 3,000 and 5,000 U.S. soldiers and support staff, as well as a few troops from the United Kingdom.

In early April 2006, in an excursion organised and financed by the British Foreign and Commonwealth Office, a group of around a hundred Chagossians were permitted to visit the British Indian Ocean Territory for the first time in over thirty years.

Court battle
In April 2006, the United States Court of Appeals for the District of Columbia Circuit rejected a lawsuit by Louis Olivier Bancoult and other Chagossians, finding that their claims were a non-justiciable political question, i.e. a question that U.S. courts cannot handle because it is properly the business of the Congress to address it legislatively.

On 11 May 2006, the Chagossians won their case in the High Court of Justice in England, which found that they were entitled to return to the Chagos Archipelago. It remained to be seen how this judgment might be implemented in practice. However, in June 2006 the British government filed an appeal in the Court of Appeal against the High Court's decision. The Foreign and Commonwealth Office put forward an argument based on the treatment of the Japanese Canadians following the attacks on Pearl Harbor.

After the Court of Appeal had upheld the decision of the High Court, the British government appealed successfully to the Judicial Committee of the House of Lords. On 22 October 2008, the Law Lords reached a decision on the appeal made by the Secretary of State for Foreign and Commonwealth Affairs, David Miliband. They found in favour of the Government in a 3–2 verdict, ending the legal process in the UK and dashing the islanders' hopes of return. The judges who voted to allow the government's appeal were Lord Hoffmann, Lord Rodger of Earlsferry, and Lord Carswell; those dissenting were Lord Bingham of Cornhill and Lord Mance.

In 2016, the British government denied the right of the Chagossians to return to the islands after a 45-year legal dispute.

In 2019, the International Court of Justice issued an advisory opinion stating that the United Kingdom did not have sovereignty over the Chagos Islands and that the administration of the archipelago should be handed over "as rapidly as possible" to Mauritius. The United Nations General Assembly then voted to give Britain a six-month deadline to begin the process of handing-over the islands.

Marine nature reserve and government communications leak 

In April 2010, the British Government—specifically, the British diplomat Colin Roberts, acting on the instructions of David Miliband—established a marine nature reserve around the Chagos Islands known as the Chagos Marine Protected Area. The designation proved controversial as the decision was announced during a period when the UK Parliament was in recess.

On 1 December 2010, a leaked US Embassy London diplomatic cable dating back to 2009 exposed British and US calculations in creating the marine nature reserve. The cable relays exchanges between US Political Counselor Richard Mills and British Director of the Foreign and Commonwealth Office Colin Roberts, in which Roberts "asserted that establishing a marine park would, in effect, put paid to resettlement claims of the archipelago's former residents". Richard Mills concludes:

However, the cable also mentions that "there are proposals (for a marine park) that could provide the Chagossians warden jobs". As of 2018, no such jobs exist. The cable (reference ID "09LONDON1156") was classified as confidential and "no foreigners", and leaked as part of the Cablegate cache.

Armed with the WikiLeaks revelations, the Chagossians launched an appeal, seeking a judgement that the reserve was unlawfully aimed at preventing them from returning home. Although United States Army soldier Chelsea Manning had been arrested nearly three years previously for the leaks, the UK government felt unable to confirm to the court that the leaked documents were genuine. It was made clear to the court that the government's inability to confirm was for two reasons: firstly, to protect itself from the charge that it created the reserve to prevent the islanders from ever returning home and, secondly, out of a purported fear that the US government might get angry if the cables were acknowledged as genuine. Despite the contents of his cable being known—"a marine park would, in effect, put paid to resettlement claims of the archipelago's former residents"—Roberts denied, when questioned in court, that there was an "ulterior motive" behind the reserve's establishment. Lord Justice Richards and Mr. Justice Mitting then refused to accept the documents as evidence, declaring that to do so would breach diplomatic privilege. The Guardian described their decision as having "far-reaching consequences" and "a severe setback for the use of material obtained from leaks or whistleblowers". In June 2013, the pair of judges turned down the appeal brought by the Chagossians, ruling that the reserve was compatible with EU law.

Pollution 
It emerged in 2014 that—for three decades, in violation of environmental rules—the American navy had dumped hundreds of tonnes of sewage and waste water into a protected lagoon on Diego Garcia. In response to the revelations, the chair of the Chagos Refugees Group UK Branch, Sabrina Jean, noted:

Discourse about the Chagossians 

The WikiLeaks cables revealed diplomatic cables between the US and UK about the Chagossians.
A cable written by D.A. Greenhill on 24 August 1966 to a US State Department official refers to the Chagossians as "some few Tarzans or Man Fridays".

Similar language appears in a 2009 US State Department cable (09LONDON1156), which offered a description of the UK government's views about the effect of the Marine Protection Act:

2012 petition 
On 5 March 2012, a petition was launched on We the People section of the whitehouse.gov website in order to ask the White House in the United States to consider the Chagos case.

The petition read as follows:

On 4 April 2012, the sufficient number of 25,000 signatures was met to require a response from the Office of the President under its policy. An undated response was posted on the White House petition web site by the United States Department of State, in the name of Michael Posner (Assistant Secretary of State for Democracy, Human Rights, and Labor), Philip Gordon (Assistant Secretary of State for European and Eurasian Affairs) and Andrew J. Shapiro (Assistant Secretary of State for Political-Military Affairs). The response read as follows:

See also 
 Depopulation of Diego Garcia
 Order in Council#United Kingdom
 Right of Return

References

Bibliography
 Wenban-Smith, N. and Carter, M., Chagos: A History, Exploration, Exploitation, Expulsion Published by Chagos Conservation Trust, London (2016),

External links 
 Let Us Return USA
 UK Chagos Support Association
 Chagos Islands Site - The oldest site in favour of the Chagos Islanders
 Let Them Return - The Chagos People's Homeland Campaign
 Diego Garcia: Paradise Cleansed by John Pilger
 Spreading democracy, by any means necessary. the US/UK and Diego Garcia
 US/UK BIOT defence agreements, 1966-1982, US Court filing
 The UK Chagos Support Association

Chagos Archipelago
Ethnic groups in the Indian Ocean
Forced migration
Chagos Archipelago sovereignty dispute
Ethnic groups in South Asia
British Indian Ocean Territory people
Ethnic groups in Mauritius
Ethnic groups in the United Kingdom